Volokolamskaya is a Moscow Metro station in Mitino District, North-Western Administrative Okrug, Moscow. It is on the Arbatsko-Pokrovskaya Line, between Mitino and Myakinino stations. Volokolamskaya opened on 26 December 2009.

Gallery

References 

Moscow Metro stations
Railway stations in Russia opened in 2009
Arbatsko-Pokrovskaya Line
Railway stations located underground in Russia